The 1942 Wisconsin Badgers football team was an American football team that represented the University of Wisconsin in the 1942 Big Ten Conference football season. The team compiled an 8–1–1 record (4–1 against conference opponents), finished in second place in the Big Ten Conference, led the conference in scoring defense (6.8 points allowed per game), and was ranked No. 3 in the final AP Poll. Harry Stuhldreher was in his seventh year as Wisconsin's head coach.

The Helms Athletic Foundation selected Wisconsin as the 1942 national champion at the end of the season, giving the program its only national championship. Ohio State, a team that Wisconsin defeated, was selected as national champion in the AP Poll.

The team played its home games at Camp Randall Stadium. During the 1942 season, the average attendance at home games was 29,026.

Schedule

Awards and honors
End Dave Schreiner received the Chicago Tribune Silver Football as the Big Ten's most valuable player. Schreiner was also selected as a unanimous first-team player on the 1942 College Football All-America Team.  Schreiner joined the United States Marine Corps and was killed in action during the Battle of Okinawa in June 1945.

In addition to Schreiner, other Wisconsin players receiving All-America or All-Big Ten honors in 1942 were:

 Fullback Pat Harder was selected as a first-team All-American by the All-America Board and the Walter Camp Football Foundation. Harder was also selected by the Associated Press (AP) and United Press (UP) as a first-team player on the 1942 All-Big Ten Conference football team.
 Center Fred Negus was selected by the AP and UP as a first-team All-Big Ten player.
 Halfback Elroy Hirsch was selected by the AP as a first-team All-Big Ten player.
 Tackle Paul Hirsbrunner was selected by the UP as a second-team All-Big Ten player.

Three players from the 1942 Wisconsin team have been inducted into the College Football Hall of Fame: Dave Schreiner in 1955; Elroy Hirsch in 1974; and Pat Harder in 1993.

Dave Schreiner received the team's most valuable player award. Schreiner and Mark Hoskins were the team captains.

References

Wisconsin
Wisconsin Badgers football seasons
Wisconsin Badgers football